The 2007 Pan American Games torch relay was a 39-day torch run, from June 5 to July 13, 2007, held prior to the 2007 Pan American Games. On June 4, the torch was lit at the torch lighting ceremony in Teotihuacán, Mexico. The flame was then taken by a Brazilian Air Force craft to Santa Cruz Cabrália, Bahia, Brazil, where the torch relay began.

The relay toured through 42 Brazilian cities - each one representing a different country in the Pan American Games. Over 2,500 torchbearers carried the flame over 11,000 kilometers. The relay originating torchbearer was Wilson Carneiro, the first Brazilian medalist at the Pan American Games, white the final torchbearer was Naiane Freire da Purificação.

Route

1 denotes municipality

External links
Official website

References

Torch
Pan American Games torch relays